Operations engineering is a branch of engineering that is mainly concerned with the analysis and optimization of operational  problems using scientific and mathematical methods. More frequently it has applications in the areas of Broadcasting/Industrial Engineering and also in the Creative and Technology Industries.

Operations engineering is considered to be a subdiscipline of Operations Research and Operations Management.

Associations 
 INFORMS
 industrial operation

See also
 Operations research
 Systems engineering
 Enterprise engineering
 Engineering management
 Business engineering

Industrial engineering